Nick's Hamburger Shop is a building at 427 Main Ave. in Brookings, South Dakota, United States, which is listed on the National Register of Historic Places.

It is also included in the Brookings Commercial Historic District, which is also National Register-listed.

Its front is divided into two narrow store fronts, one used by the Main Barbershop and one by Nick's.

References

Commercial buildings on the National Register of Historic Places in South Dakota
Mission Revival architecture
Commercial buildings completed in 1932
National Register of Historic Places in Brookings County, South Dakota
Individually listed contributing properties to historic districts on the National Register in South Dakota